The Accademia di Belle Arti di Palermo ("Academy of Fine Arts of Palermo") is a public tertiary academy of art in Palermo, Sicily. It was established in 1780.

References

External links
 official site

Art schools in Italy
Education in Palermo
Educational institutions established in 1780
1780 establishments in Italy